zh-TW is an IETF language tag for the Chinese language as used in Taiwan, meaning any of:

 Taiwanese Mandarin
 the use of traditional Chinese characters in writing, as done in Taiwan
 Taiwanese Hokkien, a variety of Min Nan Chinese, which could be indicated more specifically by nan-TW.